Iceland never ratified the Vienna Convention on Road Signs and Signals, but road signs in Iceland conform to the general pattern of those used in most other European countries, with certain design elements borrowed from Danish and Swedish practice. Signs tend to be more sparsely employed than in other European countries, especially in rural areas.

Design
Distances and other measurements are displayed in metric units. All text within the main signs and on auxiliary signs is exclusively in Icelandic with very few exceptions.

Colours and shapes
Icelandic road signs most closely resemble their Swedish counterparts, with rounded corners and yellow backgrounds. However, there are many differences in detail, especially in the silhouettes used.

Shape and colour are used to indicate the function of signs:

Typeface
A version of the Transport typeface employed on road signs in the UK – modified to include accented characters and the Icelandic letters ð (eth) and þ (thorn) – is used on Icelandic road signs.

Gallery

Warning signs

Prohibitory signs

Mandatory signs

Information signs

Service signs

F series

G series

H series

J series

Old signs

Traffic lights

References

Iceland
Road transport in Iceland